Live in LA a live album by South African musician Trevor Rabin, released on 4 February 2003 on Voiceprint Records. It was recorded on 13 December 1989 at the Roxy Theatre, Los Angeles during Rabin's tour of the United States to promote his fourth solo album, Can't Look Away (1989).

Track listing

Personnel
Trevor Rabin – vocals, guitar
Lou Molino III – drums, percussion
Mark Mancina – keyboard instrument, background vocals
Jim Simmons – bass, background vocals

References

Trevor Rabin albums
2003 live albums
Albums produced by Trevor Rabin